Battle of Landeshut may refer to:

 Battle of Landeshut (1760), at Landeshut in Silesia (now Kamienna Góra in Poland) in the Seven Years' War
 Battle of Landshut (1809), at Landshut in Bavaria, between Napoleonic France and the Austrian Empire